Six Lake is a lake in Becker and Otter Tail counties, in the U.S. state of Minnesota.

Six Lake was so named for its location in "section six" of Otter Tail County.

See also
List of lakes in Minnesota

References

Lakes of Otter Tail County, Minnesota
Lakes of Becker County, Minnesota
Lakes of Minnesota